Sergey Borisovich Abramov (born February 29, 1972) is a Moscow-based (based in Chechnya in 2000's) executive of Russian Railways and a former politician. Abramov is a graduate of the Tashkent State University of Economics.

In 2002, during the presidency of Akhmad Kadyrov, 30-year-old Abramov was appointed minister of finance of the Chechen Republic and continued until his appointment as Prime Minister. On 24 March 2004, he was appointed Prime Minister (Chairman of the Government) of the Chechen Republic by President Kadyrov with approval of the legislature. After the assassination of President Kadyrov, Abramov become acting president as per the constitutional provision at the time; his tenure as Acting President ended following the Presidential election. He himself survived a series of assassination attempts.

On 18 November 2005, Abramov survived a near-fatal car crash in Moscow and temporarily disappeared from public view. On 28 February 2006, he resigned as Prime Minister, ostensibly for health reasons but in reality to make space for Ramzan Kadyrov to be permanent Prime Minister. He is an ethnic Russian and had pro-Russian and Russian unitary political views in his administrations of Chechnya. He moved to Chechnya for his political career.

, Abramov chaired the Directorate of Railway Terminals of Russian Railways and was managing an ambitious program of rebuilding the stations in major cities.

References 

1972 births
Living people
Politicians from Moscow
Prime Ministers of Chechnya
Russian people in rail transport